"Dream On Dreamer" is a song by British acid jazz and funk group the Brand New Heavies, released in March 1994 as the lead single from their third album, Brother Sister (1994). The song is also featured on the group's remix album, Excursions: Remixes & Rare Grooves (1995), that was released in the US. It remains one of their most successful hits, peaking at number 15 in the UK and number 19 in Scotland. In the US, it reached number 51 on the Billboard Hot 100, while in Canada, it hit number 47 on the RPM Top Singles chart.

Critical reception 
Larry Flick from Billboard described the song as "a rumbling bit o' retro-funk, fueled with the sultry vocal
presence of Davenport. Song's immediately contagious chorus is the ticket to active play in pop and urban sectors." He added, "Not to be missed." Troy J. Augusto from Cash Box named it Pick of the Week, declaring it as an "infectious, groove-heavy jam". He complimented the singer as "a gifted, dynamic and quite flexible vocalist who evens lifts some of the Heavies' mediocre material out of the darkness. Luckily, this track isn't one of those lesser moments and is only guaranteed longer shelflife thanks to her presence." Another editor, Gil L. Robertson IV, named it a "standout track" from the Excursions: Remixes & Rare Grooves album. 

Dave Sholin from the Gavin Report stated that the Heavies' soon-to-be released album Brother Sister, "will be a welcome sight and sound to the thousands of fans who have been waiting patiently for its release. Expect this first single to whet everyone's appetite that much more." Caroline Sullivan from The Guardian viewed it as a "sleek" and "mainstream". Chuck Campbell from Knoxville News Sentinel remarked that on the "hook-oriented" track, "the rich-voiced Davenport is the centerpiece around which bandmates Simon Bartholomew, Andrew Levy and Jan Kincaid swirl inviting music". Maria Jimenez from Music & Media described it as a "soulful gem". Ralph Tee from Music Weeks RM Dance Update felt the group "are back in fine form on this extremely appealing new two step soul shuffler. The group's only version is naturally of acoustic orientation, with real drumming, keyboards and horns gelling very nicely on this soulful outing". Parry Gettelman from Orlando Sentinel said that the song "show the right way to update disco."

 Track listing 

 12", UK (1994)"Dream On Dreamer" (Angel Extended Mix) — 5:50
"Dream On Dreamer" (Bad Yard Dub Part 2) — 6:55
"Dream On Dreamer" (Heavies Motion Mix) — 8:35
"Dream On Dreamer" (New Degree Vocal Dub) — 6:37

 CD single, Europe (1994)"Dream On Dreamer" (Heavies Radio Version) — 3:33
"Dream On Dreamer" (Morales 7-Inch) — 3:54
"Dream On Dreamer" (Heavies Motion Mix) — 8:45
"Dream On Dreamer" (T-Empo Dub Mix) — 7:25

 CD maxi, US (1994)'
"Dream On Dreamer" (Dallas Austin Remix) — 4:49
"Dream On Dreamer" (Dallas Austin Instrumental) — 4:48
"Dream On Dreamer" (Morales Remix) — 7:30
"Dream On Dreamer" (Morales Reprise Instrumental) — 4:35
"Dream On Dreamer" (Heavies Mix) — 4:50
"Dream On Dreamer" (Heavies Mix Instrumental) — 4:49
"Snake Hips" — 2:04
"Dream On Dreamer" (The Angel Remix) — 5:54
"Dream On Dreamer" (The Angel Remix Instrumental) — 5:55

Charts

Weekly charts

Year-end charts

References

The Brand New Heavies songs
1994 singles
1994 songs
FFRR Records singles